The 2010 Malone Pioneers football team represented Malone University in the 2010 NAIA football season.  The Pioneers played their home games at Fawcett Stadium.

Schedule

Coaching staff

Head coach
The head coach was Eric Hehman, who was in his first season as the head coach of the Pioneers.  Hehman had been the head coach at NCAA Division III Greenville College for five years.  He was hired to replace Mike Gardner who resigned to take the head coaching position for the Tabor Bluejays in Hillsboro, Kansas.

Assistant coaches
Assistant coaches for the team were:
 Troy Schenk  Assistant Head Coach (Offensive Line)
 Jeff Disandro  Offensive Coordinator
 Kyle Schenk  Defensive Coordinator
 Cliff Schenk  Director of FB Operations and Assistant Coach (Running Backs & Tight Ends)
 Steve Wilt  Assistant Coach (Defensive Backs & Special Teams)
 Dwight Sutton  Assistant Coach (Defensive Backs)
 Denny Blake  Assistant Coach (Offense)
 Josh Flannery  Graduate Assistant (Wide Receivers)
 John Lane Jr.  Graduate Assistant (Defensive Line)
 Adam Chase  Student Assistant Coach (Quarterbacks)
 Kyle Julian  Assistant Coach (Offensive Line)

References

Malone
Malone Pioneers football seasons
Malone Football